Iron(tetraporphyriinato) chloride is the coordination complex with the formula Fe(TPP)Cl where TPP is the dianion [C44H28N4]2-.  The compound forms blue microcrystals that dissolve in chlorinated solvent to give brown solutions.  In terms of structure, the complex is five-coordinate with idealized C4v point group symmetry. It is one of more common transition metal porphyrin complexes.

Synthesis and reactions
Fe(TPP)Cl is prepared by the reaction of tetraphenylporphyrin (H2TPP)  and ferrous chloride in the presence of air:
H2TPP  +  FeCl2  +  1/4 O2   →   Fe(TPP)Cl  +  HCl  +  1/2 H2O

The chloride can be replaced with other halides and pseudohalides.  Base gives the "mu-oxo dimer":
2 Fe(TPP)Cl  +  2 NaOH  →   [Fe(TPP)]2O  +  2 NaCl  +  H2O

Most relevant to catalysis, the complex is easily reduced to give ferrous derivatives (L = pyridine, imidazole):
Fe(TPP)Cl  +  e-  +  2 L →   Fe(TPP)L2  +  Cl−

The complex is widely studied as a catalyst.

References

Chelating agents
Tetrapyrroles
Macrocycles
Phenyl compounds